Kikilo is an administrative ward in the Kondoa district of the Dodoma Region of Tanzania. In 2016 the Tanzania National Bureau of Statistics report there were 10,127 people in the ward, from 9,318 in 2012.

References

Kondoa District
Wards of Dodoma Region